KSML-FM (101.9 FM) is a radio station broadcasting a Spanish Variety music format. Licensed to Huntington, Texas, United States, the station serves the Lufkin-Nacogdoches area.  The station is currently owned by Kasa Family Limited Partnership.

History
The station was assigned the call letters KYBI on 1996-01-29.

In the 1990s KYBI had an all-70s format that played a lot of classic rock.  Around 1999, KYBI changed formats to hot AC as “Y-101.9”. This lasted until 2005 when Stephen Yares moved the populat Regional Mexican format from AM 1260 KSML to FM as “Super Mix 101.9.”

On 2005-02-15, the station changed its call sign to the current KSML-FM.

References

External links

SML-FM
Radio stations established in 1996